Lukman Olaonipekun popularly known as Lukesh is a Nigerian photojournalist born on December 7, 1975 in Itesiwaju Local Government, Oyo State, Nigeria. He began his photography career in 1998. Olaonipekun is the official personal photographer to the former governor of Lagos State Babatunde Fashola SAN who recently became Minister Power, Works and Housing under the new administration.

About
In 2003, he became the personal photographer to Honourable Idowu Obasa, the Onigbongbo Local Government Chairman in Ikeja, Lagos and just three years later, he became the personal photographer of the Governor of the State, His Excellency Babatunde Fashola.  Today, he still holds that position and his work has taken him around the globe.

Lukman is the author of BRF: A Story in Photographs, a book which documents the life of a serving governor in Nigeria. In 2009, he took short courses at the London School of Photography, and from 2006 to 2009, he was a participant at the World Press Photo Award. Lukman is also a member of the Photojournalists Association of Nigeria and the World Photography Organisation.

His recent book "The Fashola Years" was published in 2015 by Quramo Publishing under the Qbooks imprint.

Exhibitions
2009 - Then and Now at City Hall, Lagos Island

2013 - My Contract with Lagos at Blue Roof, Lagos

2013 - Lagos: Being and Becoming at City Hall, Lagos

Awards
2011 – Nigeria Photography Awards Best Culture Photo of the Year
2011 – Nigeria Photography Awards Best Current Affairs Photo of the Year
2012 – Nigeria Photography Awards Best Lifestyle Photo of the Year
2012 – Nigeria Photography Awards Best Nature Photo of the Year
2012 – Nigeria Photography Awards Best Wild Life Photo of the Year
2012 – Nigeria Photography Awards Best Advertising and Commercial Photo of the Year

References
Lukman Olaonipekun World Lens 
Nigerian Photography Awards 2011 
'BRF: A Story in Photographs'

External links
www.lukeshphoto.com

1975 births
Living people
Nigerian photographers
Yoruba photographers
People from Oyo State
Nigerian photojournalists